The Yukaghir Highlands are a mountainous area in the Sakha Republic and Magadan Oblast, Far Eastern Federal District, Russia.

The area is named after the Yukaghir people.

Geography  
The Yukaghir Highlands are a mountain region located at the eastern limits of the Sakha Republic and the northwestern end of Magadan Oblast, as well as a little part in the westernmost limit of Chukotka Autonomous Okrug. They include two medium height mountain ranges, the Chubukulakh Range and the Siversky Range, as well as a plateau, the Yukaghir Tableland. 

The highlands are limited by the Kolyma Lowland to the west and the courses of the Bulun and Namyndykan rivers to the south. The Kolyma Mountains rise to the east and southeast. The Arctic Circle passes through the area.

Hydrography
The Yukaghir Highlands separate the basins of the Kolyma and Omolon rivers, both flowing roughly northwards. The latter marks the eastern limit. The Berezovka River has its sources within the area of the mountains.

Flora
There are sparse forests of larch in the lower slopes of the mountain ranges and thickets of dwarf stone pine at higher altitudes. The mountaintops are covered with tundra.

References

External links
Physiogeography of the Russian Far East
Wetlands in Russia - Vol.4

Mountain ranges of Magadan Oblast
Mountain ranges of the Sakha Republic